Anomopoda is an order of the superorder Diplostraca. These crustaceans, a type of water flea, are members of the class Branchiopoda. The Anomopoda typically have five pairs of thoracic limbs, but sometimes have six pairs. The head of the Anomopoda lacks a clear separation from the trunk and the posterior, while the abdomen area gradually merges with the anterior of the trunk.

See also
Daphnia - water fleas
Rhynchochydorus

References

Cladocera
Freshwater crustaceans
Arthropod suborders